Play-Doh is a modeling compound for young children to make arts and crafts projects at home. The product was first manufactured in Cincinnati, Ohio, United States, as a wallpaper cleaner in the 1930s. Play-Doh was then reworked and marketed to Cincinnati schools in the mid-1950s. Play-Doh was demonstrated at an educational convention in 1956 and prominent department stores opened retail accounts.

Advertisements promoting Play-Doh on influential children's television shows in 1957 furthered the product's sales. Since its launch on the toy market in the mid-1950s, Play-Doh has generated a considerable amount of ancillary merchandise such as the Fun Factory.

History

Origin

The non-toxic, non-staining, reusable modeling compound that came to be known as "Play-Doh" was a pliable, putty-like substance concocted by Noah McVicker of Cincinnati-based soap manufacturer Kutol Products. It was devised at the request of Kroger Grocery, which wanted a product that could clean coal residue from wallpaper.

Following World War II, with the transition from coal-based home heating to natural gas and the resulting decrease in internal soot, and the introduction of washable vinyl-based wallpaper, the market for wallpaper cleaning putty decreased substantially. McVicker's nephew, Joe McVicker, joined Kutol with the remit to save the company from bankruptcy. Joe McVicker was the brother-in-law of nursery school teacher Kay Zufall, who had seen a newspaper article about making art projects with the wallpaper cleaning putty. Her students enjoyed it, and she persuaded Noah McVicker (who also sold the putty) and Joe McVicker to manufacture it as a child’s toy. Zufall and her husband came up with the name Play-Doh; Joe McVicker and his uncle Noah had wanted to call it "Rainbow Modeling Compound".

Launch
Joe McVicker took Play-Doh to an educational convention for manufacturers of school supplies, and Woodward & Lothrop, a department store in Washington, DC began selling the compound. In 1956, the McVickers formed the Rainbow Crafts Company to make and sell Play-Doh.  Also in 1956, a three-pack of 7-ounce cans was added to the product line, and, after in-store demonstrations, Macy's of New York and Marshall Field's of Chicago opened retail accounts. In 1957, chemist Dr. Tien Liu reduced Play-Doh's salt content (thus allowing models to dry without losing their color), and Play-Doh ads were telecast on Captain Kangaroo, Ding Dong School, and Romper Room. In 1958, Play-Doh's sales reached nearly $3 million.

Subsequent developments
In 1964, Play-Doh was exported to Britain, France, and Italy. By 1965, Rainbow Crafts issued a patent for Play-Doh.  Also in 1965,  General Mills bought Rainbow Crafts for $3 million.  In 1971, Rainbow Crafts and Kenner Products merged, and, in 1987, the Tonka Corporation bought the two. In the 1980s, its cardboard can (with a rust-prone metal bottom) was replaced with a more cost effective plastic container.  In 1991, Hasbro became the owner of Play-Doh, and continues to manufacture the product today. In 1996, gold and silver were added to Play-Doh's palette to celebrate its 40th anniversary.

Mascots

Play-Doh packaging was briefly illustrated with children in the mid-1950s, but replaced by the Play-Doh Pixie, an elf mascot which, in 1960, was superseded by Play-Doh Pete, a smock and beret-wearing cartoonish boy. By 1992, Play Doh Pete's beret was recolored in blue, and his eyes were given a more human look. Later in 2000, Play-Doh Pete's beret was replaced with a baseball cap. Play-Doh Pete later retired and was removed in 2003, lasting for 42 years. Since 2012, the Doh-Dohs are the mascots.

Ingredients
Play-Doh's current manufacturer, Hasbro, says the compound is primarily a mixture of water, salt, and flour, while its 2004 United States patent indicates it is composed of water, a starch-based binder, a retrogradation inhibitor, salt, lubricant, surfactant, preservative, hardener, humectant, fragrance, and color.

A petroleum additive gives the compound a smooth feel, and borax prevents mold from developing. Play-Doh contains some wheat and may cause allergic reactions in people who are allergic to wheat gluten. It is not intended to be eaten.

Related merchandise

In 1960, the Play-Doh Fun Factory (a toy press that extrudes the compound in various shapes) was invented by Bob Boggild and Bill Dale. The Play-Doh Fuzzy Pumper Barber & Beauty Shop of 1977 and Mop Top Hair Shop of 1986 featured a figurine whose extruded "hair" could be styled.

In 1995, an educational software CD-ROM game, Play-Doh Creations was released.

In 2003, the Play-Doh Creativity Table was sold. Play-Doh related merchandise introduced during the 2007 anniversary year included the Play-Doh Birthday Bucket, the Play-Doh Fifty Colors Pack, the Fuzzy Pumper Crazy Cuts (a reworking of the 1977 Fuzzy Pumper Barber & Beauty Shop), and the Play-Doh Creativity Center. In 2012, "Play-Doh Plus" was introduced. It is lighter, more pliable, and softer than regular Play-Doh.

Cultural impact
More than two billion cans of Play-Doh were sold between 1955 and 2005, and, in 2005, Play-Doh was being sold in 75 countries at 95 million cans a year. In the United States, more than 6,000 stores carry Play-Doh.

To mark Play-Doh's fiftieth anniversary, Demeter Fragrance Library created a limited-edition fragrance inspired by Play-Doh's distinctive odor for "highly-creative people, who seek a whimsical scent reminiscent of their childhood."

Play-Doh was inducted into the National Toy Hall of Fame at The Strong in Rochester, New York, in 1998.

In 2003, the Toy Industry Association placed Play-Doh into its "Century of Toys List", a roll call of the 100 most memorable and most creative toys of the twentieth century.

In late 2014, the company offered to replace the "Play-Doh Cake Mountain" playset's extruder tool, for free, after receiving complaints about the tool's "phallic shape".

Other media

Film
On April 2, 2015, 20th Century Fox announced work on a film adaptation with Hasbro Studios along with its subsidiary company Allspark Pictures and Chernin Entertainment producing, Jason Micallef writing, and Paul Feig directing from his production company Feigco. The film was eventually cancelled and rejected after the acquisition of Fox's parent company 21st Century Fox by The Walt Disney Company.

On March 17, 2022, it was announced that a new animated film adaptation is in development at Entertainment One and its parent company Hasbro, Emily V. Gordon writing and Jon M. Chu producing and possibly directing.

Series
A game show adaptation started streaming on Amazon Freevee initially as a one-off holiday special on December 10, 2021 and later as a full-length series on November 11, 2022. It is hosted by Sarah Hyland.

See also

 Milliput
 Plastilina
 Plasticine
 Sculpey
 Play-Doh (sculpture) by Jeff Koons

References

External links
 Play-Doh began as wall cleaner | Our History
 Playmakers Part II: Play-Doh
The Accidental Invention of Play-Doh, by David Kindy, smithsonian.com, November 12, 2019

Art and craft toys
Clay toys
1950s toys
Hasbro products
Hasbro brands
Sculpture materials
Products introduced in 1956